Rico Emanuel Abreu (born January 30, 1992) is an American professional dirt track and sprint car racing driver. Abreu won the 2014 USAC National Midget Series championship, and previously competed in the K&N Pro Series East in 2015 scoring one win.

Racing career

Early career and dirt racing

Abreu first began racing dirt bikes, but after watching an Outlaw kart race in Vallejo, California, started to race shifter karts. When he turned 15, he was given his first Outlaw kart. To support his career, his father built a th-mile asphalt oval in his backyard.  On January 24, 2009, Abreu made his Outlaw kart debut at Lakeport Indoor Speedway, finishing fourth, and scored his first Outlaw win at Cycleland Speedway. During the year, local driver Kyle Larson met Abreu at a charity karting event held at Abreu's backyard oval and, in 2011, introduced him to sprint cars. During the year, he made his Chili Bowl Nationals debut, along with running his first World of Outlaws sprint car race. He would eventually win the 2011 360 Winged Sprint Car Series Rookie of the Year Award.  In 2012, Abreu raced in the USAC National Midget Series, clinching Rookie of the Year, while qualifying for the A-main at the Chili Bowl. The next year, he won his first USAC National Midget race at Angell Park Speedway. Also in 2013, he won the Belleville Midget Nationals, the Johnny Key Classic at Ocean Speedway, the  4 Crown Nationals  at Eldora Speedway and the USAC Gold Crown at Tri City Speedway. In 2014, he won his first WoO race at the Thunderbowl Raceway and later won the USAC Honda Midget Series national title.

On January 17, 2015, Abreu returned to the Chili Bowl. On lap 26 he passed the previous year's winner Bryan Clauson and held off four-time Chili Bowl winner Kevin Swindell to win. The win was Toyota's first Chili Bowl victory and the first for owner Keith Kunz since 2002. The following year, Abreu repeated his Chili Bowl win after defeating Clauson and Zach Daum.

K&N Pro Series East
On January 20, 2015, Abreu was hired by HScott Motorsports to run full-time in the K&N Pro Series East. He made his stock car debut in the Pete Orr Memorial Super Late Model 100 at New Smyrna Speedway later in the week. On July 4, 2015, Abreu won his first ever race in the K&N Pro Series East at Columbus Motor Speedway after starting from the pole position, setting a new track record.

Camping World Truck Series
During the 2015 season, Abreu made his Camping World Truck Series debut in the Lucas Oil 150 at Phoenix International Raceway, driving the No. 31 Chevrolet Silverado for NTS Motorsports. In 2016, he signed a full-time drive for ThorSport Racing, replacing Johnny Sauter who left for GMS Racing.

Abreu almost won his first career NCWTS race at Texas on June 10. He was within a car length of race leader William Byron with 2 laps to go, but scraped the wall and ended up cutting a tire, all but riding the wall for the last lap and a half. He still ended up finishing a career-best 9th place.

On January 11, 2017, it was reported that Abreu will not return to ThorSport Racing due to sponsorship issues. However, he returned to the team for a one-off at Eldora.

Personal life
Born to a Portuguese father and Italian mother, he currently lives in Rutherford, California. His father, David, is a vineyard manager. He also has a brother and a sister. Among Abreu's hobbies is fishing.

He was born with achondroplasia, a genetic disorder that is the most common cause of dwarfism. Due to his short stature, he needs special modifications to the cockpit area of his race cars, such as foot blocks to help him reach the throttle. The car is also modified for Abreu, such as the pedals and the steering column being lengthened, with the powertrain and a-frame moved . For stock cars, the steering column, pedals, and switches are moved, while the remainder of the cockpit remains the same.

Motorsports career results

NASCAR
(key) (Bold – Pole position awarded by qualifying time. Italics – Pole position earned by points standings or practice time. * – Most laps led.)

Camping World Truck Series

K&N Pro Series East

 Season still in progress
 Ineligible for series points

References

External links

 
 

1992 births
Living people
Sportspeople with dwarfism
NASCAR drivers
American people of Italian descent
American people of Portuguese descent
Racing drivers from California
Sportspeople from the San Francisco Bay Area
People from St. Helena, California
People from Rutherford, California
World of Outlaws drivers